Helga Paris (née Steffens; born 21 May 1938) is a German photographer known, among other things, for her photographs of daily life in East Germany.

Early life
Helga Steffens, daughter of Gertrud Steffens and typesetter Wilhelm Steffens, was born just over a year before the outbreak of the Second World War in Gollnow, a small town then  in the north of Germany. In May 1945 she celebrated her seventh birthday, while the war ended in defeat for Germany. Her father and two brothers were still away, but in the meantime frontier changes mandated by the victorious powers and large scale ethnic cleansing forced Helga's mother to flee with her two daughters. They ended up in Zossen, a small town a little to the south of Berlin. There she was raised by a community of mostly women, many of whom worked. She is introduced to photography by her aunts who take many photographs.

Education 
In Zossen she went to school and successfully passed her School leaving exams in 1956. After this, till 1960, she studied fashion design at the School of Engineering for the Clothing Industry ("Berlin Ingenieurschule für Bekleidungsindustrie") in Berlin and undertook, still in Berlin, an internship at VEB Treffmodelle. After this she worked as a fashion lecturer and as a commercial artist. In 1960 she starts to take photographs with a 6x6 Flexaret camera.

It was during this time that she met the painter Ronald Paris. They were married between 1961 and 1974. Through her husband she was now quickly able to establish contacts in the East German artistic scene of the time.  By now she had also acquired a passion for photography. Like many of the German Democratic Republic's leading photographers, Helga Paris is often described as self-taught. She herself believes that much of her photographic passion and skill was acquired from two aunts who were themselves enthusiastic photographers, constantly taking pictures through the 1940s, 50s and 60s, which now Paris herself keeps carefully stored in a collection of show boxes adapted for the purpose.

Professional work 
Paris began taking photographs seriously around 1967. She was influenced by the work of Edvard Munch, Max Beckmann, Francis Bacon, and Werner Held. Between 1967 and 1968 she worked in the photo-laboratory of Walli Baucik. Her first free-lance job, in 1969, was to photographs  slaughtering at a home in Thüringen; in 1970 she shot fashion photographs for the youth magazine neues leben. In 1972 she joined the National Association of Visual Artists, which was virtually a prerequisite for success in what was now her chosen career.

Her professional work is wide-ranging. In 1975 she photographed scenes from productions by Benno Besson at the Berlin Volksbühne ("People's Theatre"). She presented her first personal exhibition in 1978, in Dresden at the Fine Arts Academy.

By the 1980s her work was concentrated increasingly on people and streetscapes, initially in Berlin where many of her subjects were neighbours and friends.   She encountered greater difficulty when undertaking an equivalent project in Halle where the people she photographed were strangers and reacted with hostility. She then took time to talk to people and ask before photographing them.   Under those circumstances citizens of Halle agreed to being photographed, though there was still reluctance to be photographed with Halle streets as background at a time when a major and long-running redevelopment project scheme involving extensive destruction of old houses was leaving the centre of the city looking badly damaged.  Her 1986 exhibition "Houses and Faces. Halle 1983-1985", planned for the city's Marktschlößchen Gallery was cancelled a few days before the scheduled opening date because her pictures gave publicity to the city's misguided building policy. By the time it was cancelled a catalogue and exhibition labels for the photographs had already been printed.

Her career as a free-lance photographer survived the changes of 1989/90 which led to the end of the German Democratic Republic, formally in October 1990 with German reunification, and for some commentators and others her photographs from the East German period have gained a wider interest as the period they depict has receded into history. Since 1996 Helga Paris has been a member of the Berlin Academy of Arts.   In 2003 her twelve part exhibition "Self images 1981-1988" in the context of the "Art in the German  Democratic Republic" exhibition drew much interest.

Grants and prizes 
 1992, 1994, 1996 Stiftung Kulturfonds stipends and grant
 1993 Grant from the Berliner Senatsverwaltung für Wissenschaft und Kultur
 2004 Hannah-Höch-Preis

References

Photographers from Brandenburg
German women photographers
Members of the Academy of Arts, Berlin
1938 births
Living people
People from Goleniów
People from the Province of Pomerania
East German photographers
East German women
20th-century women photographers
20th-century German women